Achena Prem is a 2011 Bengali romantic film directed by Swapan Saha and produced under the banner of Maa Kali Films. The movie is an unofficial remake of hit Kannada movie Mussanjemaatu. Surprisingly the fact that it is a remake of the Kannada movie has not been mentioned either on the Achena Prem's official website or in other reviews/articles on the internet. All Kannada songs from the original have been also retained in the movie.

Plot
Rahul is a popular radio jockey who likes to solve people problem. He meets Tanu and falls in love with her, but never expressed his feelings to his love interest.

Cast
 Barsha Priyadarshini as Tanu
 Anuradha Ray as Rahul's Mother
 Aakash as Rahul
 Mou Saha as Mita
 Bodhisattwa Majumdar as Tanu's Father
 Subhasish Mukherjee as Rahul's office Colleague

Music
The film music composed by Ashok Bhadra.

Reception 
A critic from The Indian Express wrote that "His [Saha's] recent films,however,reveal he has lost his magic touch. But this is probably because he casts new actors in challenging leads,which they are unable to handle. Achena Prem is one example".

References

External links
 
 Achena Prem at the Gomolo

2011 films
Bengali-language Indian films
2010s Bengali-language films
Films directed by Swapan Saha
Bengali remakes of Kannada films
Indian romantic drama films